Fritillaria persica is a Middle Eastern species of flowering plant in the lily family Liliaceae, native to southern Turkey, Iran, Iraq, Lebanon, Syria, Cyprus and Israel.  It is widely cultivated as an ornamental and naturalized in the Lazio region of Italy. It is the sole species in Fritillaria subgenus Theresia.

The Latin specific epithet persica means “Persian”, referring to the modern country of Iran.

A plant commonly found in cultivation outside its range is the cultivar 'Adiyaman', which is taller and more free-flowering than populations of the species inside its native range. This cultivar has gained the Royal Horticultural Society’s Award of Garden Merit.

References

persica
Garden plants
Plants described in 1753
Taxa named by Carl Linnaeus